The Type 1934A destroyers, also known as the Z5 class, were a group of twelve destroyers built in the mid-1930s for Nazi Germany's Kriegsmarine. Five survived the war.

Design and description
The Type 1934A destroyers were repeats of the Type 1934 class with a modified bow to improve seakeeping that was only partially successful at best. A , a short keel that had a shallow wedge-shaped cross-section, was added under their transoms, in order to improve their turning circles and raise their sterns at high speed. This had the effect, however, of forcing the bow deeper into the water which aggravated the lack of sheer forward, throwing spray over the bridge, making No. 1 gun impossible to work and the upper deck hazardous to walk upon. A more serious problem was that it caused a continuous sagging force on the hull which required the reinforcement of the amidships hull plates to prevent cracking. They still retained the over-complicated and troublesome boilers of the earlier ships

They were divided into 15 watertight compartments of which the middle 7 contained the propulsion and auxiliary machinery and were protected by a double bottom that protected the middle 47% of the ships' length. Active stabilizers were fitted to reduce roll. They had a complement of 10 officers and 315 enlisted men, plus an additional 4 officers and 19 enlisted men if serving as a flotilla flagship.

The Type 1934As were powered by two Wagner geared steam turbine sets, each driving a single three-bladed  propeller using steam provided by six high-pressure Wagner or Benson water-tube boilers with superheaters. The ships were equipped with two steam-driven  turbogenerators, one in each engine room.

The Type 1934A ships were armed with five  SK C/34 guns in single mounts with gun shields. One pair each was superimposed, fore and aft of the superstructure and the fifth mount was positioned on top of the rear superstructure. Their anti-aircraft armament was made up of four  SK C/30 anti-aircraft guns in single mounts, with 8,000 rounds of ammunition, and six  C/30 anti-aircraft guns in single mounts, with 12,000 rounds of ammunition. The ships carried eight above-water  torpedo tubes in two power-operated mounts amidships. Four depth charge throwers were mounted on the sides of the rear deckhouse and they were supplemented by six racks for individual depth charges on the sides of the stern. Sufficient depth charges were carried for either two or four patterns of sixteen charges each. Mine rails could be fitted on the rear deck that had a maximum capacity of sixty mines. 'GHG' (Gruppenhorchgerät) passive hydrophones were fitted to detect submarines.

The Type 34As were equipped with a C/34Z analog fire-control director on the roof of the bridge that calculated the gunnery data using range estimates provided by the two  stereoscopic rangefinders, one abaft the rear funnel and the other just behind the director. It transmitted the bearing and elevation data to the gun crews and then fired the guns simultaneously. A  rangefinder provided data to the 3.7 cm AA guns while the 2 cm guns used a hand-held  rangefinder.

Modifications
The staukeils were removed in 1940–1942 and the stabilizers proved to be ineffective and were replaced by bilge keels as the ships were refitted. A  active sonar system was installed on two of the destroyers by the end of 1939 and the rest were supposed to be fitted by the end of 1940. The following year the Type 34As began to receive FuMO 21 search radars and various models of radar detectors. These were installed in a cabin at the rear of the bridge roof, behind the rangefinder, and the radar antenna was positioned on top of the cabin roof, so close to the foremast that it could not fully revolve. The addition of  so high up in the ships caused stability problems. To compensate for these additions, the foremast searchlight and the aft rangefinder were removed and the forward rangefinder was replaced by a  model, totaling . The addition of more depth charges and degaussing equipment more than offset the saving and meant that the motor boat, its derrick and the electric capstan also had to be removed, for a net addition of  lower in the ships. In mid- to late 1942, the surviving ships had their funnels cut down to reduce top weight.

Beginning in late 1941, the survivors had their light anti-aircraft armament augmented by a single 2 cm quadruple  mount that replaced the two guns on the aft superstructure. More 2 cm guns were added over the course of the war and all of the survivors except  exchanged a 12.7 cm gun for more 2 cm and 3.7 cm guns in the so-called "Barbara" refit in late 1944. A total of fourteen 3.7 cm and ten 2 cm guns was typical of these ships at war's end, but they varied amongst themselves significantly. Around 1944 the ships had their radars replaced by a FuMO 24 search radar and three of the five of the survivors had their foremasts rebuilt in a goal-post shape to allow the  antenna to fully rotate. A FuMO 63 K Hohentwiel radar replaced the searchlight on its platform abaft the rear funnel and FuMB 1 Metox radar detectors were fitted on all five destroyers.

Ships

Service history
The Type 34s spent the prewar years training and showing the flag. Z5 Paul Jacobi and Z8 Bruno Heinemann exercised off the coast of Norway where the latter evaluated  guns planned for installation on the Type 1936 destroyers in April 1938. Three months later Z7 Hermann Schoemann hosted Adolf Hitler for a short tour. The following month all of the completed destroyers participated in the August Fleet Review by Hitler and the Regent of Hungary, Admiral Miklós Horthy and the following fleet exercise. Three ships accompanied the heavy cruiser  on her voyage to the Mediterranean in October. Three others were among the escorts for the heavy cruiser  with Hitler aboard as the Germans occupied Memel, Lithuania, in March 1939. Some of the ships participated in the fleet exercise in the western Mediterranean in April and May.

Notes

Citations

References

 

 

 
Type 1934 destroyers